Harvey L. Strelzin (July 19, 1906 – December 8, 1993) was an American politician who served in the New York State Assembly from the 57th district from 1969 to 1980.

References

1906 births
1993 deaths
Democratic Party members of the New York State Assembly
20th-century American politicians